Saratoga is an unincorporated community in Simpson County, in the U.S. state of Mississippi.

History
A post office called Saratoga was established in 1900, and remained in operation until 1920. The community's name is a transfer from Saratoga, in Upstate New York. A variant name is "Togey".

References

Unincorporated communities in Mississippi
Unincorporated communities in Simpson County, Mississippi
Mississippi placenames of Native American origin